was a Japanese fortune teller and writer. She was an author of over 100 books. In addition to her regular celebrity appearances on Japanese television, she was known for her belief that ancestor worship is central to Japanese identity.

Biography
Hosoki began managing Tokyo clubs and coffee shops while still a teenager, eventually running up debts to Japanese organized crime members. In 1983, she married influential Japanese power broker Masahiro Yasuoka, who died that same year.

Celebrity
Hosoki appeared frequently on the original Iron Chef, where she served as one of the four celebrity judges that would determine the outcome of each match. She was often seen stating her opinions very strongly on Japanese TV shows. Some of her views may be taken as conservative. She had repeatedly made very traditionalist statements on women in the family, stating that a woman's main function should be to support her husband's career. She has also publicly endorsed prime-minister Junichiro Koizumi's controversial visits to Yasukuni Shrine.

Hosoki's celebrity fans include sumo wrestling yokozuna (grand champion) Asashōryū. They appeared together on TV specials and Asashōryū once rented her white Rolls-Royce. She maintained a residence in Arashiyama, Kyoto City.

References

1938 births
2021 deaths
20th-century astrologers
21st-century astrologers
Japanese astrologers 
Japanese television personalities
Japanese writers
Writers from Tokyo